Michael Andrews (born 14 November 1956) is an Indian former professional football referee, who officiated in the National Football League, and for FIFA. He has refereed in tournaments such as AFC Champions League, AFC Asian Cup and Nehru Cup.

After retirement as a referee, Andrews served as a referee assessor with FIFA and Asian Football Confederation.

See also
List of football referees

References

External links
 Michael Andrews profile at soccerpunter.com

1956 births
Living people
Indian football referees